Jennie King (born 28 February 1986, now married Jennie Magee) is an Irish female badminton player. In 2012, she won Irish Future Series tournament in women's doubles event with her partner Sinead Chambers. In 2016, she became the coach of Irish national badminton squad U-13.

References

External links
 

Irish female badminton players
1986 births
Sportspeople from Dublin (city)
Living people